John Joseph Francis Mulcahy (July 20, 1876 – November 19, 1942) was the winner of the 1904 Olympic double scull event with his partner William Varley. The duo also won the silver medal in the pair without coxswain event. Mulcahy was one of the most accomplished rowers to come from the New York City area and served as president of the Atalanta Boat Club (established in 1848) on New York City's Harlem River. He graduated from Fordham University in 1894 and established Fordham's first rowing team in 1915. He was inducted into the National Rowing Hall of Fame in 1956 and the Fordham University Athletic Hall of Fame in 1991.

References

External links
Olympic Database Rowing
Official Olympic Site

1876 births
1942 deaths
American male rowers
Rowers at the 1904 Summer Olympics
Olympic gold medalists for the United States in rowing
Olympic silver medalists for the United States in rowing
Fordham University alumni
Medalists at the 1904 Summer Olympics

Fordham Preparatory School alumni